Scurge: Hive is an action-adventure video game by Orbital Media released for the  Game Boy Advance and Nintendo DS in 2006. The game follows the protagonist Jenosa Arma, a female bounty hunter tasked with hunting a parasitic lifeform called the "Scurge" an alien entity capable of rapidly adapting to and infecting biological, mechanical, and digital systems, including the player. Throughout the game, Jenosa Arma will have to battle various forms of the Scurge virus and race against the clock as the parasite slowly takes over Jenosa's body. The gameplay takes place in an isometric perspective.

Plot
The story of Scurge: Hive follows Jenosa Arma, who has been contracted by the military on a rescue and salvage mission to Confederation Research Lab 58 on planet Inos. The perpetrator of the disaster is a virulent organism known as "Scurge", a parasite which has the ability to transform various organisms and technologies into Scurge derivatives. Jenosa has been equipped with a suit that resists infection. Unfortunately, it can only slow the infection down rather than make her immune; she is infected with Scurge the moment she first encounters it. The story establishes an atmosphere that is highly detailed for a portable game. The ending leaves the door open for a sequel.

Gameplay

Scurge: Hive is an action-adventure game that incorporates elements of many different games; Scurge emphasizes platforming elements, though the game's isometric vantage point makes jumps difficult to align. In addition to Jenosa's standard jump move, she can also attach a mechanical tether to a hook and swing longer distances, jump in mid air and grab onto horizontal pipes and ledges. The game's upgrade system allows the player to progressively open up more of the game world. Scattered throughout are simple puzzles. 

The game's isometric perspective and the inability to run while shooting puts the emphasis on aiming and risk-taking. Combat makes use of a rock-paper-scissors system, where a weapon will deal more damage to one type of enemy and powers up another. Jenosa will receive three elemental weapons: electromagnetic pulse, combustion and dissipate. EMP does more damage against mechanical enemies but increases the power of energy-based enemies; combustion works well against biological enemies but increases the strength of mechanical foes; dissipate effectively destroys energy foes but gives additional power to biological adversaries. Scurge: Hive frequently throws multiple enemies of different kinds at the player, forcing difficult decisions about which weapon to use.

Tying the game together is the game's infection meter. When the meter reaches 100%, Jenosa's health deteriorates rapidly. When her health reaches zero, she becomes a Scurge host. There are various cleansing stations (which also act as the game's save points) scattered about the game world that heal Jenosa. The result quickens the pace of the game.

Reception

The Game Boy Advance version received "generally favorable reviews", while the DS version received "average" reviews, according to the review aggregation website Metacritic.

References

External links
 

2006 video games
Action-adventure games
Game Boy Advance games
Nintendo DS games
SouthPeak Games
Video games scored by Jake Kaufman
Video games developed in Canada
Video games featuring female protagonists
Video games with isometric graphics
Metroidvania games
Multiplayer and single-player video games